The 2019 WCT Arctic Cup was held May 23 to 26 at the Taimyr Ice Arena in Dudinka, Russia. It was the final event of the 2018–19 curling season. In the final, Scottish Team Muirhead defeated Russian Team Kovaleva 5–4 to claim the title. Canadian Team Einarson defeated Team Sidorova from Russia to win the 3rd place medal. The total purse for the event was $US 50,000.

Teams
The teams are listed as follows:

Round-robin standings 
Final round-robin standings

Round-robin results
All draw times are listed in Krasnoyarsk Standard Time (UTC+07:00).

Draw 1
Thursday, May 23, 14:30

Draw 2
Thursday, May 23, 18:00

Draw 3
Friday, May 24, 09:00

Draw 4
Friday, May 24, 12:00

Draw 5
Friday, May 24, 16:00

Draw 6
Friday, May 24, 19:00

Draw 7
Saturday, May 25, 09:00

Draw 8
Saturday, May 25, 12:00

Draw 9
Saturday, May 25, 16:00

Draw 10
Saturday, May 25, 19:00

Playoffs
Source:

Semifinals
Sunday, May 26, 09:00

Third place game
Sunday, May 26, 14:00

Final
Sunday, May 26, 14:00

References

External links
CurlingZone
Official Site

2019 in Russian sport
2019 in curling
May 2019 sports events in Russia
International curling competitions hosted by Russia
Sport in Krasnoyarsk Krai